The Murad are an Arab tribe of eastern Yemen.  

The Murad belong to the southern group of the Madhhij. They are described as retaining a typically Beduin character and their territory, called Bilad Murad, lies in the governorate of Marib and parts of al-Baydha and Dhamar Governorates in northern Yemen.

References

Ethnic groups in Yemen
Tribes of Arabia
Yemeni tribes
Bedouin groups